Oaks Sixth Form College is a consortium of six secondary school sixth forms in South-West Birmingham.

The consortium consists of: Dame Elizabeth Cadbury School, Harborne Academy, Hillcrest School and Sixth Form Centre, Lordswood Sixth Form Centre, Shenley Academy, and St. Thomas Aquinas Catholic School.

References

Education in Birmingham, West Midlands
Sixth form colleges in the West Midlands (county)
Higher education colleges in England